Brisa Ailen Carraro (born 8 May 2005) is an Argentine artistic gymnast.  She is the 2021 South American champion on the uneven bars.

Early life
Carraro was born in Buenos Aires in 2005.  She won the 2016 edition of the TV talent contest Combate de Talentos.

Gymnastics career

Junior

2018 
Carraro started the season competing at the Junior Pan American Championships, where she helped Argentina finish third as team; Carraro finished twenty-fourth in the all-around.  Additionally she finished seventh floor exercise.  Carraro next competed at the Argentinian Club Championships where she placed sixth in the all-around and helped her club place fourth.  In October Carraro competed at the Junior South American Championships where she helped Argentina finish second as a team and individually she placed third in the all-around.  During event finals she placed sixth on balance beam.  Carraro ended the season competing at the Argentinian national championships where she placed sixth in the all-around.  She won gold on balance beam.

2019–2020 
At the Club Championships Carraro placed fourth in the all-around.  At the Flanders International Team Challenge she placed twenty-sixth in the all-around and helped Argentina finish seventh.  Carraro was selected to compete at the inaugural Junior World Championships where she helped Argentina finish eighteenth as a team.  Individually she finished 52nd in the all-around.  At the Argentine National Championships Carraro finished second in the all-around, first on uneven bars, and third on balance beam.  Carraro ended the season competing at the Junior South American Championships.  She placed first in the all-around and helped Argentina place first as a team.  During event finals she placed third on balance beam and fourth on uneven bars.

Most competitions were canceled or postponed in 2020 due to the global COVID-19 pandemic.  Therefore Carraro did not compete that year.

Senior

2021
Carraro turned senior in 2021.  She returned to competition at the 2021 Pan American Championships where she helped Argentina place third as a team and individually she placed eleventh in the all-around.  During event finals she placed sixth on uneven bars. Carraro ended the year competing at the South American Championships where she helped Argentina finish second as a team.  Individually she won gold on uneven bars and placed fourth on vault.

2022 
Brisa competed at the Pan American Championships where she helped Argentina place fifth as a team.  Individually she placed sixth in the all-around and eighth on floor exercise.  At the South American Games Carraro helped Argentina finish second a team.  She finished third in the all-around behind Júlia Soares and Carolyne Pedro.  Additionally she won silver on uneven bars and balance beam, once again behind Pedro and Soares respectively.

Competitive history

References

External links
 

2005 births
21st-century Argentine women
Argentine female artistic gymnasts
Competitors at the 2022 South American Games
Living people
South American Games bronze medalists for Argentina
South American Games medalists in gymnastics
South American Games silver medalists for Argentina
Sportspeople from Buenos Aires